Harakiri (or hara-kiri) most often refers to a form of seppuku (or ritual suicide), often miswritten as "harikari". 

Harakiri may also refer to:

Film and television
 Harakiri: Die Tragödie einer Geisha, a 1913 German film by Harry Piel
 Harakiri (1919 film), a German film by Fritz Lang
 Hara-Kiri (1928 film), a French film by Henri Debai and Marie-Louise Iribe
 The Battle (1934 film), also released as Hara-Kiri and Thunder in the East, a French film by Nicolas Farkas and Viktor Tourjansky
 Harakiri (1962 film), a Japanese film by Masaki Kobayashi
 Harakiri (1970 television film), a Danish television film by Pantomima Alfreda Jarryho
 Hara-Kiri: Murder, a 1974 episode of the US television series Hawaii Five-O
 Harakiri (1975 film), a Turkish film by Ertem Göreç
 Harakiri (1986 television series), a Danish television series
 Hara-Kiri (1996 film), a French film by Yves Fajnberg
 Harakiri (2000 film), a Dutch film by Jimmy Tai
 Hara-Kiri: Death of a Samurai, a 2011 Japanese film by Takashi Miike, the remake of the 1962 film

Music
 Harakiri (album), the third album by Armenian-American singer Serj Tankian
 "Harakiri", a song from the album
 "Harakiri", a song from the 2007 album Turn the Lights Out by The Ponys
 "Hari Kari", a song from the 2009 album Ignore the Ignorant by The Cribs
 Harakiri Karaoke, a solo project of Chris Wheelie, member of the Bus Station Loonies
 Harakiri City, a 1996 album from the Venezuelan rock band Caramelos de Cianuro

People
 Harry Caray (1914–1998), American sportscaster and Chicago Cubs announcer
 Harry Carey (actor) (1878–1947), American actor known for his work in silent films

Places
 Harakiri Yagura, one of the yagura (tombs) where Hōjō Takatoki allegedly killed himself at the fall of the shogunate in 1333
 Harakiri (ski piste), the steepest ski slope of Austria

Video games
 Harakiri (video game), a 1990 PC game from Game Arts
 Harakiri Seppukumaru, one of the enemies in the 1995 Super Famicom game Ganbare Goemon Kirakira Douchuu: Boku ga Dancer ni Natta Wake

Other uses
 HRK (gene), pronounced "harakiri", a human gene
 Hara-Kiri (magazine), a French journal
 Harakiri (opera), a 1973 opera composed by Peter Eötvös